Gilbert George Tebbitt (13 September 1908 – 29 December 1993) was an English cricketer active from 1934 to 1938 who played for Northamptonshire (Northants). He was born in Welton Grange, Northamptonshire and appeared in eleven first-class matches as a righthanded batsman who scored 248 runs with a highest score of 41.  He died in Northampton, aged 85.

Notes

1908 births
1993 deaths
English cricketers
Northamptonshire cricketers